Oudon may refer to:
 Oudon (river), in western France
 Oudon, a commune in western France